Cornea plana 1 (CNA1) is an extremely rare congenital hereditary deformity of the eye surface, leading to severe decrease in corneal curvature.

See also
 Cornea plana 2

References

External links 

Congenital Clouding of the Cornea - eMedicine; by Noah S Scheinfeld, MD, JD, FAAD and Benjamin D Freilich, MD, FACS

Eye diseases